CJSA-FM is a Canadian radio station, which broadcasts at 101.3 MHz in Toronto, Ontario. The station broadcasts in 22 languages reaching a majority of the South Asian audience. True to its name, "Canadian Multicultural Radio", CJSA serves well over 16 cultural and ethnic groups. CJSA's studios are located on Rexdale Boulevard in Etobicoke, while its transmitter is located atop First Canadian Place.

The station's programming primarily targets South Asian communities, with programming in languages including Bengali, Gujarati, Hindi, Kannada, Konkani, Macedonian (Voice of Macedonia), Malayalam (Madhurageetham), Marathi, Nepali, Punjabi, Sinhalese, Somali, Tamil, Tagalog (FilTown Radio), Telugu (Morning Raaga), Tibetan, Twi and Urdu (Radio Pakistan Toronto).

CJSA signed on in 2004, adopting a frequency formerly used by CHIN as a rebroadcaster to fill in reception gaps. CHIN's FM rebroadcaster now airs on 91.9 FM.

The CJSA call sign also formerly belonged to a tourist information station in Sainte-Agathe-des-Monts, Quebec. Operated by the town's chamber of commerce, that station voluntarily surrendered its broadcast license in 2002. The former CJSA has no relation to the current CJSA-FM in Toronto.

In December 2013, CJSA signed on HD Radio operations. CJSA airs Tamil language programming on their HD-2 subchannel. CJSA is the second Canadian radio station to use the technology, the first being CING-FM in Hamilton. The station has stated in a letter to the CRTC that it is interested in broadcasting up to 5 HD Radio subchannels, each of a different language for a different ethnic population (HD2 being Tamil, HD3 being Punjabi, HD4 being Hindi and Urdu, or Aboriginal/First Nations, and HD5 being data transmission).

References

External links
 Diversity FM
 CJSA-HD2 Tamil FM
 Broadcasting Decision CRTC 2003-115
 
 

JSA
JSA
South Asian Canadian culture
Radio stations established in 2004
2004 establishments in Ontario